The Korean Academy of Science and Technology (KAST) is South Korea's highest academy of science and serves as an integrated think-tank for the country's science and technology. It contributes to national development by promoting science and technology through active participation of its member scientists and engineers who have demonstrated professional excellence domestically and internationally in their respective fields.

KAST will contribute to the globalization of science and technology by playing the role of the principal contact point for international cooperation and information exchanges, through bilateral and/or multilateral academic exchange programs with foreign academies, public semi-scientific lectures and "Science Hall of Fame" program, cooperation with international scientific and technological organizations, and friendly relations and exchanges with overseas scholars.

KAST was founded in 1994 to play a strong role in helping South Korea climb the technology ladder. KAST has also served to encourage cooperation between scientists in South and North Korea in the science and technology sector. The non-profit institute has also strengthened global cooperation by operating the secretariat for the 17-member Association of Academies of Science in Asia (AASA) since 2000.

International standing
KAST is an internationally recognized academy of science. KAST has 34 Nobel Laureates amongst its foreign members including Steven Chu, who is a co-winner of Nobel Prize in Physics in 1997 and head of the U.S. Department of Energy during the Barack Obama administration, Robert B. Laughlin, head of the Korea Advanced Institute of Science and Technology and Jerome I. Friedman, who earned the 1990 Nobel Prize in Physics.

Awards
KAST and DuPont Korea cooperate in awarding the DuPont Science Award. The award recognizes South Korean scientists' contribution to scientific studies and advancement in the country and serves to encourage further excellence. Since 1997, KAST also presents the annual Young Scientist Award to four individuals in research fields. Many of the winners are employed at SKY, KAIST, or POSTECH at the time of the award and later frequently work for KAIST or the Institute for Basic Science.

Leadership
Chung Kun-mo, former a department head at the International Atomic Energy Agency (IAEA), took the helm of the Korean Academy of Science and Technology (KAST) in February 2004 at the state-sponsored institutes headquarters in Bundang, Gyeonggi-do. Under his leadership Korea strives to open the door to third generation technology by taking the initiative in the global high-tech fields, and promoting cutting-edge technologies.

References

External links
 

Scientific organizations based in South Korea
Members of the International Science Council